The 1968 Stanley Cup playoffs, to decide the 1968 championship of the National Hockey League (NHL) was the first after the expansion from six to twelve teams. The playoff system was thus expanded from a four-team to an eight-team tournament, and was designed so that four of the new expansion teams would qualify for the postseason.

The defending champion Toronto Maple Leafs did not qualify and a new champion would be crowned. The Montreal Canadiens would defeat the St. Louis Blues in four straight to win the Stanley Cup.

Format
All of the 'Original Six' teams were placed in the new Eastern Division, and all of the new teams placed in the new Western Division. Each division contributed four playoff teams. Division teams then played off to produce a divisional champion, and the two divisional champions played off in the Final to win the Stanley Cup.

The imbalance between the new teams and old was readily apparent in the standings. All four of the East Division teams had a better record than the top team in the West.

Series
All series but Bruins-Canadiens had a game postponed after the Assassination of Martin Luther King, Jr. on April 4.

Quarterfinals

(E1) Montreal Canadiens vs. (E3) Boston Bruins
The Montreal Canadiens were the best regular season team, earning 94 points. The Boston Bruins earned 84 points to finish third in the East Division. This was the thirteenth playoff series between these two rivals, with Montreal winning ten of their twelve previous series. Their most recent series had come in the 1958 Stanley Cup Finals, which Montreal won in six games. These teams split their ten-game regular season series.

The Bruins, making their first appearance in the playoffs since 1959, were swept in four games.

(E2) New York Rangers vs. (E4) Chicago Black Hawks
The New York Rangers earned 90 points to finish second in the East Division. The Chicago Blackhawks finished fourth in the East Division with 80 points. This was the second playoff series between these two teams. Their only previous series came in the 1931 semifinals, where Chicago won the two-game total goals series 3 goals to 0. New York earned eleven of twenty points in this year's regular season series.

The Black Hawks, led by Bobby Hull and Stan Mikita upset the Rangers in six to set up a Montreal-Chicago East Division showdown.

(W1) Philadelphia Flyers vs. (W3) St. Louis Blues
The Philadelphia Flyers were West Division Champions, earning 73 points. The St. Louis Blues earned 70 points to finish third in the West Division. This was the first playoff series for both teams. Philadelphia earned sixteen of twenty points in this year's regular season series.

Philadelphia was upset by the Blues, led by goaltender Glenn Hall and coached by future Hall of Fame coach Scotty Bowman, in seven games.

(W2) Los Angeles Kings vs. (W4) Minnesota North Stars
The Los Angeles Kings finished second in the West Division with 72 points. The Minnesota North Stars earned 69 points to finish fourth in the West Division. This was the first playoff series for both teams. Minnesota earned fourteen of twenty points in this year's regular season series.

The North Stars defeated the Kings in seven games.

Semifinals

(E1) Montreal Canadiens vs. (E4) Chicago Black Hawks
This was the 14th playoff series between these two teams. Their most recent series previous to this one was in the 1965 Stanley Cup Finals, which Montreal won four games to three. Montreal earned fourteen of a possible twenty points from the ten 1967-1968 regular season matchups between the two teams.

The Black Hawks could not provide another upset, and lost to the Canadiens in five games, giving Montreal their only defeat of the playoffs.

(W3) St. Louis Blues vs. (W4) Minnesota North Stars
St. Louis earned twelve of twenty points in this year's regular season series.

Ron Schock's goal in double OT, called the "Midnight Goal" by many hockey fans, gave the Blues the series and sent them to the Stanley Cup Final.

Finals

The Montreal Canadiens advanced to their fourth consecutive Stanley Cup Final, having won the championship in 1965 and 1966. The St. Louis Blues beat out the five other teams also playing in their inaugural season to reach the Final. Montreal earned seven of eight points in this year's regular season series.

Blues coach Scotty Bowman, a long-time member of the Canadiens organization was unable to spur the Blues to an upset. The Canadiens, led by Jean Beliveau and Henri Richard swept the series in four games.

Playoff bracket

Awards and records

See also
 1967–68 NHL season

References

 

Stanley Cup playoffs
playoffs
Stanley Cup Playoffs
Stanley Cup Playoffs